Schmitt may refer to:
 Schmitt (surname), a surname and list of people with the name
 Schmitt family, a noble Bavarian family
 Schmitt, Germany, a municipality in the Eifel area of the Rhineland-Palatinate state in western Germany
 Schmitt Music, an American retail company specialising in musical instruments, sheet music and accessories
 USS Schmitt (DE-676), a Buckley-class destroyer escort in the United States Navy

See also
 Schmidt (disambiguation)
 Schmit, a surname
 Schmitt and Henry Manufacturing Company
 Schmitt Brothers, barbershop quartet
 Schmitt Gillenwater Kelly syndrome, an autosomal dominant syndrome
 Schmitt trigger, a type of comparator circuit in electronics
 Schmitten (disambiguation)